The Municipal District of Ranchland No. 66 is a municipal district (MD) in southwest Alberta, Canada. Ranchland's rugged foothill terrain is unsuited for the crop agriculture practiced elsewhere in Alberta, and ranching remains the single livelihood of its inhabitants. With a 2016 population of 92, it is the least populated municipal district in Alberta, and its population density of 29 square kilometres for every resident is almost exactly equal to that of the Northwest Territories.

History 
The MD was incorporated in 1995 from the Improvement District No. 6.

Geography

Communities 
There are no communities located within the MD of Ranchland No. 66.

Demographics 

In the 2016 Census of Population conducted by Statistics Canada, the MD of Ranchland No. 66 had a population of 92 living in 38 of its 57 total private dwellings, a  change from its 2011 population of 79.

The MD of Ranchland No. 66's 2013 municipal census counted a population of 104.

See also 
List of communities in Alberta
List of municipal districts in Alberta
Rural Municipality of Glen McPherson No. 46 - the least-populated rural-equivalent municipality in Canada, with 72 residents in 2016

References

External links 

 
Ranchland